The discography for American country music artist Jim Ed Brown consists of twenty-two studio albums, two compilation albums and fifty-one singles.

Studio albums

1960s

1970s–2010s

Albums with Helen Cornelius

Compilation albums

Singles

1960s

1970s–2010s

Singles with Helen Cornelius

As a featured artist

Charted B-sides

Notes
A^ "Morning" also peaked at number 47 on the Billboard Hot 100.

References

Country music discographies
Discographies of American artists